Crematogaster aurita is a species of ant in tribe Crematogastrini. It was described by Karavaiev in 1935.

References

aurita
Insects described in 1935